"#Selfie" (stylized in all caps with hashtag) is a song produced by American DJ duo the Chainsmokers. It was released on January 29, 2014, through Dim Mak Records.

Background and promotion
The Chainsmokers, composed of Andrew Taggart and Alex Pall, had noticed how the word selfie had become a trend and they wanted to take advantage of it. They made a demo of a song containing a monologue from a female clubber about taking good selfies. Inspiration came from the regular club going women that the Chainsmokers saw on their nights out in New York City. So when they were composing the track, they wanted to incorporate the "let me take a selfie" line in it somehow. The Chainsmokers described in an interview with The Phoenix New Times,
Honestly, "#Selfie" is kind of a phenomenon for us. We made it and thought it was funny and put it out as an edit. Then Dim Mak wanted to buy it, and they bought it from us and put it out officially and we made a video for it. This was all just because we thought it was fun. And then the song just kind of took on a life of its own. Which is honestly really great because it's brought in a new audience of people that listen to music that we've made that we're more passionate about.
The duo released the track to their SoundCloud account along with other posts in Vine and Instagram.

Music video

A music video for the song was also released and features actual selfies from Steve Aoki, founder of Dim Mak, Snoop Dogg, David Hasselhoff, Tyler Breeze, A-Trak, and Ian Somerhalder among others. Oliver Luckett, CEO of social media marketing firm TheAudience, said that the song is "so on point – it's shit-white-girls-say-meets-a-club-remix". TheAudience introduced the Chainsmokers to Aoki, helped create the "#Selfie" video and released it on January 29, 2014, on YouTube, utilizing the network of celebrities to promote it. According to Pall, "the video inherently had this viral concept built into it, which certainly helped get it off the ground".

Composition
"#Selfie" is a big room house song that is predominantly instrumental, though featuring spoken word verses; the uncredited talking female vocals in the song are by Alexis Killacam. The song details a narcissistic young woman at a club, presumably speaking to friends, as she is concerned about taking selfies and uploading them to her Instagram account, while she criticizes other people at the club, including their outfits, in addition to dealing with a guy named Jason who she has a love/hate relationship with. At the end of each spoken verse, she says "Let me take a selfie". The intonation of the spoken lyrics bears a strong resemblance to that of the opening of Sir Mix-A-Lot's 1992 single "Baby Got Back". Similar to "#Selfie", the words are critical of the appearance of another woman. The lyrics make several cultural references, including Instagram and the Cedric Gervais remix of Lana Del Rey's song, "Summertime Sadness".

Critical reception
The song has been compared to the viral impact of "Harlem Shake" by Baauer. The Chainsmokers explained that one of their initial intentions with "#Selfie" was to re-create the viral impact that "Harlem Shake" had, with the general public taking the song and maybe including their own interpretations along with the beat. The structure of it has drawn comparisons to the 1982 hit "Valley Girl" by Frank Zappa and his daughter, Moon Unit Zappa.

Commercial performance
"#Selfie" debuted on the Billboard Dance/Electronic Songs chart at number 19, with first week sales of 9,000 digital downloads according to Nielsen SoundScan. The next week, "#Selfie" sold another 53,000 digital downloads and debuted at number 55 on the Billboard Hot 100, the highest debut of the week. The sales drove the song to number six on the Dance/Electronic Songs and number three on the Dance/Electronic Digital Songs charts. "#Selfie" additionally debuted at number seven on Dance/Mix Show Airplay, becoming only the sixth song in the chart's 11-year history to debut as high or above and the first since Lady Gaga entered at number six with "Alejandro" in May 2010. In its third week of release, the song sold another 88,000 downloads (up by 64%) to move into the top ten of the Hot Digital Songs chart. It also reached a peak of number 27 on the Pop Songs chart. On the Hot 100, the song consecutively jumped to number 28. It also started on the Hot Dance Club Songs chart at number 33. The fourth week saw the song sell a further 111,000 digital downloads and moved to number 18 on the Hot 100. It reached the top of the Dance/Electronic Songs, and also moved up the other charts like Dance/Electronic Streaming Songs (16–7; 1.4 million US streams, according to Nielsen BDS), Dance/Mix Show Airplay (4–2) and Hot Dance Club Songs (33–19). "#Selfie" sold another 101,000 copies next week and moved to number 16 on the Hot 100. As of June 2014, the song has sold 865,000 copies in the United States.

In the United Kingdom, "#Selfie" debuted at number 115 on the UK Singles Chart and moved to number 42 the next week. The song finally peaked at number 11 in the UK. In Australia "#Selfie" debuted at number 98 on the ARIA Charts, and moved to a peak of number 3.

In 2015, the Japanese pop trio MAX released a cover version of the song, renamed "#SELFIE ~ONNA NOW~." The song was released to commemorate their 20th anniversary.

Track listing

Charts

Weekly charts

Year-end charts

Certifications

Release history

References

External links
 

2014 songs
2014 singles
The Chainsmokers songs
Viral videos
Novelty songs
Narcissism in fiction
Songs written by Andrew Taggart
Selfies
Internet memes introduced in 2014
Republic Records singles